Mount Scalpello (Italian: Monte Scalpello) is a  hill in central eastern Sicily, Italy. The hill is mostly known for Triassic and Neolithic remains being found in 1997 and there it is mostly linked with Canadian campaign of WW2 in Italy where a mule path south of the hill was the location of multiple CYR advances during night operations. After which two companies held the hill against constant German mortar and artillery.

References 

Hills of Italy